Pig Rock is a rock, 65 m high, the largest of a group of rocks lying  east of the east end of Nelson Island, in the South Shetland Islands. This rock, known to sealers in the area as early as 1821, was charted and named by DI personnel on the Discovery II in 1935.

See also
 List of Antarctic and sub-Antarctic islands
 South Shetland Islands

References
 SCAR Composite Antarctic Gazetteer.

External links
 SCAR Composite Antarctic Gazetteer.

Rock formations of Antarctica